JVP may stand for:
Janatha Vimukthi Peramuna, People's Liberation Front, a Sri Lankan Socialist Party
Jerusalem Venture Partners, an Israeli-American media venture capital
Jewish Voice for Peace, an American advocacy organization concerned with the Israeli-Palestinian conflict
Johnson Voorsanger Productions, original name of ToeJam & Earl Productions
Journal of Vertebrate Paleontology, a scientific journal
Jugular venous pressure, an important marker elicited during clinical examination to assess right heart function
Jyotirvidya Parisanstha, Oldest association of amateur astronomers in India